Laurène Lusilawu Bafuidisoni (born 9 September 1993), known as Laurène Lusilawu, is a DR Congolese footballer who plays as a midfielder for FCF Amani. She has been a member of the DR Congo women's national team.

Club career
Lusilawu has played for FC Solidarité and Amani in the Democratic Republic of the Congo.

International career
Lusilawu capped for the DR Congo at senior level during the 2012 African Women's Championship.

References

External links

1993 births
Living people
Footballers from Kinshasa
Democratic Republic of the Congo women's footballers
Women's association football midfielders
Democratic Republic of the Congo women's international footballers
21st-century Democratic Republic of the Congo people